Linda Caroline Sundblad (born 5 July 1981, in Lidköping) is a Swedish singer, actress and model.

Career

Lambretta 
Dropping out of school at the age of 15 to join the pop-rock music band Lambretta, she experienced much success at a young age. After releasing three albums with Lambretta, she decided in Autumn 2005 to go solo.

Solo 
Her first solo single, "Oh Father", was released in September 2006 and her debut album, Oh My God!, a couple of months later. "Oh Father" was nominated for a Grammis award. Musicwise it remained silent around Sundblad until the second part of 2009 when the new single "2 All My Girls" was released and a second album announced for 24 March 2010.

Other projects 
She is also featured on the Reflections album by Apocalyptica, for which she sings the vocals to "Faraway Vol.2". Sundblad works currently with House music artist Rasmus Faber; she sang for him on the single "Everything Is Alright", which was released on 22 November 2008 and on his second single "Always", which was released on 6 April 2009. Sundblad also features on Rasmus Faber's debut album Where We Belong.

Melodifestivalen 2011 
Linda Sundblad participated in Melodifestivalen 2011, the Swedish selection for the Eurovision Song Contest 2011. She competed in the third semi-final on 19 February 2011 in Cloetta Center, Linköping with the song "Lucky You" which finished 6th and did not qualify for the final.

Model career 
Sundblad has worked since 2005 as a model, presenting L'Oréal and Munthe plus Simonsen.

Radio career 
Since 8 November 2006 Sunblad has worked as a radio announcer at Sveriges Radio where she moderated the programme P3 Star.

Discography 
Singles
 "Oh Father" (2006, SE #1)
 "Lose You" (2006, SE #2)
 "Back in Time" (2007)
 "Who (Q Boy)" (2007)
 "Cheat" (2007)
 "2 All My Girls" (2009, SE #50)
 "Let's Dance" (2010, SE #7)
 "Perfect Nobody" (2010)
 "Lucky You" (2011)

Albums
 Oh My God! (2006, SE #11)
 Manifest (2010)
 Öppna ditt hjärta så ska du få EP (2012)

Lambretta 
Albums 
 Breakfast (July 1999)
 Lambretta (June 2002)
 The Fight (March 2005)

Singles
 "Blow Up All My Fuses" (1999)
 "Absolutely Nothing" (1999)
 "And All The Roses" (1999)
 "Bimbo" (April 2002)
 "Creep" (August 2002)
 "Perfect Tonight" (2002)
 "Chemical" (2004)
 "Anything" (2004)
 "Kill Me" (2004)

Guest appearances 
Singles

 with Apocalyptica
 "Faraway Vol.2" (2003)

 with Rasmus Faber
 "Everything Is Alright" (2008)
 "Always" (2009)

 with Kleerup
 "History" (2009)

TV appearances 
 "Sommarkrysset" (2007)
 "FörKväll" (2006–2007)
 "Nyhetsmorgon" (2006–2007)
 "Bingolotto" (2006)
 "Studio Virtanen"  (2006)
 "Vi i femman"  (2005)
 "Körslaget" (2010)
 "Allsång på Skansen" (2010)

References

External links

 Official site
 Official MySpace
 

1981 births
Living people
Swedish pop singers
Swedish singer-songwriters
Swedish female models
Swedish actresses
People from Lidköping Municipality
English-language singers from Sweden
21st-century Swedish singers
21st-century Swedish women singers
Melodifestivalen contestants of 2011